The Green Salon is a 1944 German drama film directed by Boleslaw Barlog and starring Paul Klinger, Margarete Haagen and Dorothea Wieck.

Partial cast
 as Wilma
Walter Bluhm as Oswin, handyman
Hans Brausewetter as Dr. Artur Bütow, lawyer
Lina Carstens as Klara, 'the horse', Anna Bütow's housekeeper
Gerhard Dammann as Kniese, bricklayer
Margarete Haagen as Frau Geheimrat Anna Bütow
Lieselotte Heßler as Margarete v. Hintelmann, geb. Bütow
Paul Klinger as Wolf Termöhl, cand.arch.
Gunnar Möller as Jörgeli
Ilse Pellemaier as Erna
Willi Puhlmann as repairer
Arthur Schröder as Georg v. Hintelmann, Ministerialrat
Babsi Schultz-Reckewell as Inge von Hintelmann, daughter
 as Sabine Bütow, her granddaughter
Ally Waltemath as Annemarie
Dorothea Wieck as Edith Retzlaff
Ewald Wenck as Müller, Lohndiener
Elisabeth Wendt as Lieselotte, his wife
Adolf Ziegler as Eugen Retzlaff, broker
Jan Hendriks as Bit Role

References

External links

Films of Nazi Germany
German drama films
1944 drama films
Films directed by Boleslaw Barlog
Terra Film films
German black-and-white films
1940s German films
1940s German-language films